Islote Sucre, also called Johnny Cay, is a small island in the Caribbean Sea belonging to the Archipelago of San Andrés, Providencia and Santa Catalina.

Description 
Islote Sucre is located approximately 1.5 km north of the island of San Andrés, the largest in the archipelago. It has a total area of 49,411 m² (4.94 hectares), making it the largest of the cays that surround San Andrés.

The climate is stable all year round, hovering around 27º C, but there are cool breezes throughout the year. There are coconut trees and white sand beaches. Islote Sucre can be reached by sea using boats that depart from neighboring San Andrés and tourism is the main economic activity.

See also
Caribbean Region, Colombia
San Andrés (island)

References

Caribbean islands of Colombia
Islands of the Archipelago of San Andrés, Providencia and Santa Catalina